Tappeh Hammam or Tappeh Hamam may refer to:
 Tappeh Hammam-e Olya
 Tappeh Hammam-e Sofla
 Tappeh Hammam-e Vosta